Guy Learmonth (born 20 April 1992 in Berwick-upon-Tweed) is a Scottish and Great British athlete specialising in the 800 metres. His PB currently stands as 1:44.73 and he is the 3rd fastest Scottish 800m athlete of all time. Learmonth reached the final at the 2014 Commonwealth Games and the 2015 European Indoor Championships, finishing 6th in both. He was named the GB&NI captain for the European Indoor Championships in 2019.
Guy has broken the Scottish 800m Junior Record 9 times and holds the English AAA U20 Indoor & BUCS Championship records.

Biography 
Before turning to athletics at age 17, Learmonth practised rugby for the Border Reivers.

Learmonth holds a Sports Management degree from Loughborough University and in 2021 completed an Diploma in Egyptology (Distinction).

Athletics career
Guy Learmonth's first major athletics competition was the 2011 European Athletics Junior Championships. He competed in the 800 metres event, winning his heat. In his semi-final, he finished fifth, a place which could have earned him a fastest loser spot, but the other semi-final was won in a time two seconds faster than Learmonth's race, meaning that both fastest loser qualifiers came from the second semi-final. He also competed at the BUCS Indoor Championships that year, winning the 800 metres by over a second and setting a new championships best performance. He won his first national senior medal in 2011, taking a bronze at the British Indoor Athletics Championships.

In 2012, he competed at his first Diamond League meeting at the Bislett Games in Oslo, setting a new personal best in the 800 metres National event in finishing second. He regards it as his most memorable performance. He also retained his 800 metres title in 2012 at the BUCS Indoor Championships, winning by over a second, like the previous year. On his debut at the BUCS Outdoor Championships he won gold in the 800 metres, in a competition that took place at the Olympic Stadium. He improved on his result from the 2011 British Indoor Championships by winning a silver medal in 2012 championships in the 800 metres at the EIS Sheffield.

In 2013, he chose not to defend his 800 metres titles at either the indoor or outdoor BUCS Championships, and attempted the 1500 metres at the outdoor championships, the only times he raced over the distance that year. He won both his heat and his semi-final, but finished a tenth of a second outside the medals, in fourth place. He competed in the British Indoor Championships, winning a bronze medal.

In 2014, he moved back down to the 800 metres at the BUCS Indoor Championships, winning his third 800 metres title. He won the Indoor Glasgow International Match winning over a rarely run 600m race in a time of 1:16:48 and in the process broke the Scottish National 600m record which has been held for 40 years, at the same time, breaking the British U23 600m Indoor record and going to number 3 on the UK All Time rankings. Learmonth competed in the Commonwealth Games in Glasgow achieving 6th place in the 800 metres final with a personal best time of 1:46.69. He got there by qualifying as a fastest loser from the heats, and securing the third automatic qualifying spot in his semi-final by two hundredths of a second

In 2015, Learmonth was crowned British Indoor Champion in the 800 metres. He also won both his heat and semi-final of the 800 metres before going on to finishing 6th in the final at the European Indoor Championships in Prague, Czech Republic.

In 2016, he won a bronze medal, coming third at the British Indoor Championships in the 800 metres. Similarly, in 2017 Learmonth was crowned British Indoor Champion, and also won a silver medal in the British Outdoor Championships. Shortly after, Learmonth competed in the London Anniversary Games where he achieved a lifetime beat of 1:45.77 and the qualifying standard for the London World Championshils in August 2017.

In the 2019 Indoor European Championships Learmonth tried to go through a non-existent gap up the inside of Mark English, hampering the Irish athlete, in the 800m semi final, and was subsequently disqualified, with English promoted to the final on appeal.  Indeed, Learmonth's previous two runs had been shrouded in controversy, as firstly he was promoted from 3rd place to 2nd in the British Trials for the 800m, after the disqualification of Jamie Webb, for "track contact" on Learmonth.  and secondly, Learmonth fell in the 800m in Birmingham at the Muller Indoor Grand Prix and proceeded to punch the track in anger and broke his hand.

Competition record

1Did not finish in the semifinals

Personal bests
Outdoor
400 metres – 48.00 (Glasgow 2012)
600 metres – 1:16.70 (Amsterdam 2015)
800 metres – 1:44.73 (London 2018)
1500 metres – 3:45.40 (Bedford 2013)
Indoor
600 metres – 1:16.48 (Glasgow 2014)
800 metres – 1:47.00 (Birmingham 2017)

References

Living people
1992 births
Scottish male middle-distance runners
Athletes (track and field) at the 2014 Commonwealth Games
Athletes (track and field) at the 2018 Commonwealth Games
Commonwealth Games competitors for Scotland
People from Berwick-upon-Tweed
Sportspeople from Northumberland
Alumni of Loughborough University
World Athletics Championships athletes for Great Britain